The Night of the Hunter is a 1955 American film noir thriller directed by Charles Laughton and starring Robert Mitchum, Shelley Winters and Lillian Gish. The screenplay by James Agee was based on the 1953 novel of the same name by Davis Grubb. The plot involves a serial killer who poses as a preacher and charms an unsuspecting widow to get his hands on $10,000 in stolen bank loot hidden by her executed husband.

The novel and film draw on the true story of Harry Powers, who was hanged in 1932 for the murder of two widows and three children in Clarksburg, West Virginia. The film's lyrical and expressionistic style, borrowing techniques from  silent film, sets it apart from other Hollywood films of the 1940s and 1950s, and it has influenced such later directors such as Rainer Werner Fassbinder, Robert Altman, and Martin Scorsese.

Despite receiving negative reviews upon its original release, it has been positively re-evaluated in later decades and is now considered one of the greatest films ever made. It was selected for preservation in the United States National Film Registry in 1992. The influential French film magazine Cahiers du Cinéma selected The Night of the Hunter in 2008 as the second-best film of all time, behind Citizen Kane. In spite of the film's later acclaim, the negative reaction to its premiere made it Charles Laughton's only feature film as director.

Plot
Reverend Harry Powell is a misogynistic serial killer and self-proclaimed preacher traveling along the Ohio River in West Virginia during the Great Depression. He is arrested for driving a stolen car and serves 30 days at Moundsville Penitentiary. There he shares a cell with Ben Harper, who killed two men in a bank robbery for $10,000. Harper made his children, John and Pearl, promise to never reveal where he hid the money. Despite Powell's attempts to worm it out of him, Harper takes the secret to his grave when he is hanged for the murders.

Upon his release from prison, Powell visits Harper's tiny hometown, where he charms the townsfolk and woos Harper's widow, Willa, a waitress for Walter Spoon and his wife Icey. Overnight Powell manages to win the town's trust and weds Willa, but John remains instinctively distrustful of him. Powell suspects that John knows where the money is hidden and threatens him to reveal its location. John accidentally reveals that he and Pearl know where the money is hidden. After Powell refuses to consummate their marriage, Willa deludes herself that he married her to redeem her soul and begins preaching alongside him in tent revivals. She later overhears Powell threatening Pearl to reveal the money’s whereabouts and loses her faith in him.

After Powell murders Willa and ties her body to a Model T that he sinks in the river, he claims that she left her family for a life of sin when Walter and Icey question her abrupt disappearance. He threatens the children and learns the money is hidden inside Pearl's doll. Birdie Steptoe, an elderly friend of the family, discovers Willa’s body while fishing but refrains from telling the police for fear that he will be accused of murder.

The children escape an enraged Powell and attempt to seek refuge with Birdie, who they find in a drunken stupor. They use their father's small johnboat to flee down the river and find sanctuary with Rachel Cooper, a tough old woman who looks after stray children.

Powell tracks them down, but Rachel sees through his deceptions and runs him off her property with a shotgun. Powell returns after dark. During an all-night standoff, Rachel gives Powell a face full of birdshot and he flees into her barn. She summons the state police, who arrive and arrest Powell for Willa’s murder. John breaks down during Powell’s handcuffing, having a flashback of his father’s fate. He beats the doll against Powell's struggling body in anguish, spilling the cash.

During Powell’s trial John cannot bring himself to testify against him. After Powell's sentencing, Rachel takes John and the other children away as a deranged Icey leads a lynch mob toward the police station. Powell is escorted out the back to safety just in time, but the prison hangman vows to see him again soon. John and Pearl spend their first Christmas together with Rachel and her brood of stray children.

Cast

Production

This was the only film directed by the actor Charles Laughton. Laughton had directed plays on Broadway, most produced by his friend Paul Gregory.

Development
Harold Matson, a literary agent, sent a copy of the 1953 novel The Night of the Hunter by Davis Grubb to Paul Gregory. He sent the book to Laughton, who loved it and described it as a "nightmarish Mother Goose story". Laughton contacted Grubb, and the two of them instantly got along very well. He traveled to Philadelphia, where Grubb lived, and they spent five days discussing ideas for the film. Grubb had studied art in college, so he offered to draw sketches as a form of inspiration. Laughton loved the drawings, and many of them were used in the film's storyboard.

At first Grubb was being considered to write the screenplay himself, but the studio wanted to hire someone with experience writing for films. James Agee was hired as the screenwriter because he was from the South and had experience writing about the Depression. Agee began writing in April 1954, and finished in June, but his script was 293 pages: much too long for a feature film. Laughton made significant rewrites to the script, and his was the version used for shooting, even though he insisted that Agee be credited as the only writer. Agee's original script ended with a shot of children's faces floating among the stars, an idea that was eventually moved to the opening of the film. Throughout 1954, Gregory worked with the Production Code Administration to change the script to meet the guidelines of the Production Code. There was much concern about depicting a preacher on screen as an evil person, and Gregory made an effort to make the character of the Reverend not appear to be a real, ordained minister. Eventually the script was approved, but Protestant groups who had read the script continued to object to the film's production.

While preparing for the filming, Laughton studied silent films by viewing their original nitrate prints, including The Birth of a Nation, Intolerance, and The Four Horsemen of the Apocalypse. He wanted to "restore the power of silent films to talkies."

The budget of the film was a little under $600,000, of which about $75,000 was for the rights to adapt the novel.

Casting

Laughton's initial thought after reading the novel was to cast himself in the role of the preacher, but Gregory convinced him that no studio would finance a film unless they cast someone else. For the most part, he did not hold traditional auditions for the actors; he simply met with them to get a sense of their personalities and whether they were right for the role.

Laughton considered casting Gary Cooper as Harry Powell, but Cooper did not accept the role as he thought it might be detrimental to his career. John Carradine expressed interest in the role of the reverend, as did Laurence Olivier, but his schedule was not free for two years. Robert Mitchum was eager for the part of the preacher. When he auditioned, a moment that particularly impressed Charles Laughton was when Laughton described the character as "a diabolical shit," and Mitchum promptly answered "Present!" Laughton liked Mitchum for the role partly due to his sexual persona, but Grubb was concerned about the character of the preacher being considered sexual. Laughton told him, "If you want to sell God, you have to be sexy."

Agnes Moorehead, Grace Kelly, and Betty Grable were all considered for the role of Willa Harper. In the end Laughton chose Shelley Winters because he felt she had a vulnerable quality and was more of a serious actor than a movie star; she committed to the role only two weeks before filming began. In her 1989 memoir, Winters described this as "probably the most thoughtful and reserved performance I ever gave".

Laughton's first pick for the role of Rachel Cooper was his wife Elsa Lanchester. Jane Darwell and Louise Fazenda also were considered. Lanchester, for reasons unknown to Laughton, turned down the role, suggesting silent movie star Lillian Gish for the role. A doubtful Laughton went to New York for the purpose of watching films in which Gish starred. These included the shorts and feature films she made with pioneer D.W. Griffith. Gish had gotten word of his watching these old movies, and when she asked him why, he replied, "When I first went to the movies, they sat in their seats straight and leaned forward. Now they slump down, with their heads back, and eat candy and popcorn. I want them to sit up straight again."

Filming

Principal photography of The Night of the Hunter began on August 15 and ended on October 7, 1954, a total of 36 days of shooting. Laughton kept the editor and musical composer on set during filming, which was very uncommon at the time. Mitchum originally suggested Laughton to shoot the film in authentic Appalachian locations, but the director could not afford the budget to do on-location shooting. Besides, he wanted to create the film's unique look on Hollywood sound stages and found what he was looking for at Pathé, Republic Studios, and the Rowland V. Lee ranch in the San Fernando Valley. Certain cutaway shots and compositing shots were shot in West Virginia. Laughton hired Terry Sanders as second unit director in order to scout and shoot the river scenes because he had recently directed an Academy Award-winning short film A Time Out of War, which mostly took place on a river.

Rather than shooting with traditional takes, Laughton had the crew only slate at the beginning of each reel of film and let the camera roll continuously until the reel ran out. This was so that he could direct the actors without waiting to reset the camera and sound equipment, not unlike the way silent films used to be directed. Shelley Winters told Laughton she had this image of Willa as being "a fly fascinated by a spider, and she very willingly walks into this web". He liked this image and told her to channel that into the performance. Mitchum's performance in the film has been described as Brechtian acting, which Laughton had extensive experience with. According to Lillian Gish, Laughton was very unsure of himself on set as this was his first time directing a film, and when someone would give him a suggestion he would start talking about fears that his whole vision was wrong. Laughton's directing style was supportive and respectful of the actors' input and several of the actors have said it was among their favorite professional experiences.

The director of photography was Stanley Cortez, who also shot Orson Welles' 1942 film The Magnificent Ambersons. Because Laughton had very little experience working with film, Cortez would visit his house to explain various concepts of camera lenses, camera heights, and what effect each of them gave. Laughton told Cortez that the nitrate prints of the silent movies that he had been watching for research impressed them with how sharp they looked, so he asked Cortez to create that same sharpness for The Night of the Hunter. The studio brought most of the crew from a recent film Black Tuesday because they had worked so well together, and Cortez had experimented with a new black-and-white film Kodak Tri-X on that production, with great results. He chose to shoot certain scenes of this film on Tri-X because it had a sharp contrast that would help fulfill Laughton's vision. The studio however, tried to convince them to shoot on color film instead because they thought it would sell more tickets. Gregory fought to keep it black-and-white: "I could not see this film being in color." The style of the cinematography was split up between the two units: the first unit of the crew shot the scenes in and around the Harpers' home, which were very dark, whereas the second unit shot the scenes traveling along the river, which were designed to look more like images from the children's perspective. One scene in particular that Cortez has spoken about is in the bedroom after Willa has overheard Powell threatening the children. He lit this scene with a halo of light surrounding Willa's head on the pillow, foreshadowing that her death is imminent. Cortez also brought back the Iris shot in one scene, as an homage to silent films.

Laughton drew on the harsh, angular look of German expressionist films of the 1920s, which is especially noticeable in the art direction by Hilyard Brown. He had the idea that children notice only certain details of their surroundings that they are focused on, which is why some set pieces are somewhat abstract and minimal: neon lights that are not attached to a particular store, white picket fences that are not surrounding any house, the barn along the river that looks like a painting, and the "chapel-like" parents' bedroom. The river scenes with the children were all shot on a sound stage. The shot of John looking out of the barn window and seeing Powell's silhouette on the horizon was created using a little person and a miniature horse. The underwater scene showing Willa's dead body was shot in a studio using a mannequin with a custom mask to make it look like Winters.

Score
The film's score, composed and arranged by Walter Schumann in close association with Laughton, features a combination of nostalgic and expressionistic orchestral passages. The film has two original songs by Schumann, "Lullaby" (sung by Kitty White, whom Schumann discovered in a nightclub) and "Pretty Fly" (originally sung by Sally Jane Bruce as Pearl, but later dubbed by an actress named Betty Benson). A recurring musical device involves the preacher making his presence known by singing the traditional hymn "Leaning on the Everlasting Arms". RCA Victor was impressed by the score, so in 1955 they released a soundtrack with Schumann's score and Laughton narrating an abridged version of the story, also written by Grubb.

Post production
The film's editor, Robert Golden, has said that after he screened the complete film to one of the United Artists studio executives for the first time, the executive told Golden, "It's too arty."

Release

The Night of the Hunter premiered on July 26, 1955, in Des Moines, Iowa, a special event to raise money for the YMCA in Gregory's hometown, which included a parade and a broadcast on The Tonight Show. It later had its premiere in Los Angeles on August 26, 1955, and in New York on September 29, 1955.

To promote the film, the Los Angeles Herald-Express serialized the film's script throughout April 1955. The film also received an extensive promotional campaign from United Artists, but they weren't sure about the best way to promote it because it didn't fall into any typical film genres, and the promotional material didn't give a good sense of what the film was about. However, one of the film's advertisements won an award for being in the top 50 best advertisements of 1954 from the American Institute of Graphic Arts. According to Paul Gregory, "absolutely no money was spent on promotion...United Artists didn't have the muscle, desire, or intelligence to handle the picture." He originally had the idea to tour the film "road show style", stopping at certain cities that were familiar with Laughton's plays, but he could not convince the studio.

The Roman Catholic Diocese of Cheyenne denied the film's release, and Gregory wanted to put together a lawsuit against them, but the studio would not allow him to.

Reception

Contemporaneous
The Night of the Hunter was a total flop with both audiences and critics at its initial release, and Laughton never directed another film. Bosley Crowther of The New York Times called the film "a weird and intriguing endeavor," adding: "unfortunately the story and the thesis presented by Mr. Grubb had to be carried through by Mr. Laughton to a finish—and it is here that he goes wrong. For the evolution of the melodrama, after the threatened, frightened children flee home, angles off into that allegorical contrast of the forces of Evil and Good." Gene Arneel of Variety summarized: "The relentless terror of Davis Grubb's novel got away from Paul Gregory and Charles Laughton in their translation of Night of the Hunter. This start for Gregory as producer and Laughton as director is rich in promise but the completed product, bewitching at times, loses sustained drive via too many offbeat touches that have a misty effect." Harrison's Reports wrote, "The picture might have some appeal for those who patronize art houses in search of the unusual in movie fare, but the great majority of those who see it will look upon it as a choppily-edited, foggy melodrama peopled with foggy characters." Life summed up the film, "If sometimes it strains too hard at being simple and winds up being pretentious, it still is one of the year's most interesting and provocative films."

The Legion of Decency gave the film a B because it degraded marriage, and the Protestant Motion Picture Council rated it "objectionable," saying that any religious person would be offended by it. The film was also banned in Memphis, Tennessee, by the city's head of censorship, Lloyd Binford. Great Britain rated the film "adults only."

The film was shot in black and white in the styles and motifs of German Expressionism (bizarre shadows, stylized dialogue, distorted perspectives, surrealistic sets, odd camera angles) to create a simplified and disturbing mood that reflects the sinister character of Powell, the nightmarish fears of the children, and the sweetness of their savior Rachel. Due to the film's visual style and themes, it is also often categorized as a film noir.

Laughton took this commercial failure of his first film personally, and never attempted to make another film.

Retrospective
At the time of its release, The Night of the Hunter received mixed reviews, but over the years it has been reassessed and is now an undisputed classic. It began as a cult film, with a small group of fans, and regularly played at museums and in revival houses. Its popularity grew as a new generation of children were exposed to the film when it played on television. In the 1970s, as the field of film criticism began to expand, many articles were written about the film.

Roger Ebert wrote, "what a compelling, frightening and beautiful film it is! And how well it has survived its period. Many films of the mid-1950s, even the good ones, seem somewhat dated now, but by setting his story in an invented movie world outside conventional realism, Laughton gave it a timelessness... It is one of the most frightening of movies, with one of the most unforgettable of villains, and on both of those scores, it holds up... well after four decades." Dave Kehr wrote that "Charles Laughton's first and only film as a director is an enduring masterpiece—dark, deep, beautiful, aglow... The source of its style and power is mysterious—it is a film without precedent and without any real equals." 

The Night of the Hunter was rated No. 90 on Bravo's 100 Scariest Movie Moments. In a 2007 listing of the 100 Most Beautiful Films, Cahiers du cinéma ranked The Night of the Hunter No. 2. It is among the top ten in the BFI list of the 50 films you should see by the age of 14. In 2008, it was ranked as the 71st greatest movie of all time by Empire magazine in its issue of The 500 Greatest Movies of All Time. In 2012, Sight and Sound magazine's decennial "Greatest Films of All Time" poll ranked it as the 63rd greatest film ever made; in 2022, the same poll put it at No. 25.

In 1992, the United States Library of Congress deemed The Night of the Hunter to be "culturally, historically, or aesthetically significant", and selected the film for preservation in its National Film Registry. The site's critical consensus reads, "Featuring Robert Mitchum's formidable performance as a child-hunting preacher, The Night of the Hunter is a disturbing look at good and evil."

American Film Institute recognition
 AFI's 100 Years...100 Thrills – No. 34
 AFI's 100 Years...100 Heroes & Villains – Reverend Harry Powell - Villain No. 29

Mark Callaghan, the lead singer for the Australian band The Riptides, parodied Mitchum's character in the music video for the 1982 track, Hearts And Flowers.

Reverend Harry Powell's speech about love and hate has become a memorable moment in film history. In the 1989 Spike Lee film Do the Right Thing, the character Radio Raheem wears brass knuckles saying "love" and "hate" on each hand and gives a speech that is an almost verbatim copy of Powell's.

The Coen brothers have referenced The Night of the Hunter in several of their own films, including The Big Lebowski (the line "the Dude abides," which is an echo of Rachel's closing line "They abide, and they endure") and True Grit (the visual style of Rooster's night ride with Mattie, which is similar to that of John and Pearl's river journey, and the use of the music from Leaning on the Everlasting Arms).

In the episode "Fall" of the television series Better Call Saul, The Night of the Hunter is shown playing in a retirement home as series protagonist Jimmy McGill attempts to deceive a number of his clients.  Reverend Powell's hand gestures during his "right hand, left hand" speech are juxtaposed with similar gestures made by Jimmy, highlighting his charismatic but duplicitous nature.

In Emerald Fennell's 2020 film Promising Young Woman a clip from The Night of the Hunter is playing in a scene where the protagonist's parents are watching TV on the couch. In a later scene, the song “The Pretty Fly,” from the soundtrack to The Night of the Hunter, plays after the protagonist makes a disturbing discovery.

Home media
The Night of the Hunter was released on DVD by MGM Home Entertainment in 2000. On November 16, 2010, the film was released on Blu-ray and DVD by The Criterion Collection in association with the University of California, Los Angeles film archive. Among other supplemental material the Criterion edition includes are various interviews with the cast and crew along with an appearance of the cast on The Ed Sullivan Show performing a deleted scene from the film and the two-and-a-half hour documentary Charles Laughton Directs "The Night of the Hunter".

Related works
In 1974, film archivists Robert Gitt and Anthony Slide retrieved several boxes of photographs, sketches, memos, and letters relating to the film from Laughton's widow Elsa Lanchester for the American Film Institute. Lanchester also gave the Institute over 80,000 feet of rushes and outtakes from the filming. In 1981, this material was sent to the UCLA Film and Television Archive where, for the next 20 years, they were edited into a two-and-half hour documentary that premiered in 2002, at UCLA's Festival of Preservation.

The film was remade in 1991 as a TV movie starring Richard Chamberlain.

In 2020, it was reported that Universal Pictures is working on a remake of the film set in the present day, and being written by Matt Orton.

See also
 Lillian Gish filmography
 List of American films of 1955
 Lonely hearts killer

References

Works cited
 
 
 
 
 
 
 
 Ziegler, Damien: La Nuit du chasseur, une esthétique cinématographique, Bazaar and co, 2008. 160 pages.

Notes

External links

The Night of the Hunter essay  by Peter Rainer on the National Film Registry website 

 
 
 The Night of the Hunter at the TCM Movie Database
 
 The Night of the Hunter (1955) analysis of film by Tim Dirks at Filmsite.org
 "Text and Texture: A comparative analysis of The Night of the Hunter, Cape Fear (1962) and Cape Fear (1991)" analysis of film by Harvey O'Brien
 The Night of the Hunter at Film Noir of the Week by Bruce Crowther
 "Why I love Night Of The Hunter" article by Margaret Atwood: "Why I Love Night Of The Hunter" at The Guardian (UK)
 "The Hidden Hunter" article by Robert Gitt at The Guardian (UK)
 "DVD review: Discovery: The Night of the Hunter - 2002" essay by Leonard Maltin on Gitt's presentation of extremely rare footage
 "Charles Laughton Directed A Masterpiece" article by Amber Grey at BellaOnline
 "The Night of the Hunter: Holy Terror" an essay by Terrence Rafferty at the Criterion Collection
 The Night of the Hunter essay by Daniel Eagan in America's Film Legacy: The Authoritative Guide to the Landmark Movies in the National Film Registry, A&C Black, 2010 , pages 502-503

1955 films
1955 directorial debut films
1955 horror films
1950s Christmas films
1950s crime thriller films
1950s serial killer films
American black-and-white films
American crime thriller films
American serial killer films
1950s English-language films
Expressionist films
Films about capital punishment
Films about siblings
Films based on American novels
Films based on thriller novels
Films directed by Charles Laughton
Films scored by Walter Schumann
Films set in the 1930s
Films set in West Virginia
Films shot in Los Angeles County, California
Films shot in West Virginia
Films with screenplays by James Agee
Films with screenplays by Charles Laughton
Southern Gothic films
United Artists films
United States National Film Registry films
Uxoricide in fiction
1950s American films